Napaporn Tongsalee (born 21 October 1979) is a retired Thai tennis player.

In her career, she won six doubles titles on the ITF Women's Circuit, including the 2006 "Incheon Women's Challenger", 2006 Ho Chi Minh City and the 2005 Phuket tournaments doubles titles.

She also won the 2005 "Our Lady Of Bellefonte Hospital Tennis Classic" singles tournament in Ashland, Kentucky. On the 7th of August 2006, she reached her career-high singles ranking of 226 on the WTA rankings. On the 21st of August 2006, she reached her career-high of 194 in the WTA doubles rankings.

ITF finals

Singles (2–4)

Doubles (6–6)

External links
 
 
 

Living people
Napaporn Tongsalee
Napaporn Tongsalee
1979 births
Tennis players at the 2002 Asian Games
Napaporn Tongsalee
Napaporn Tongsalee
Napaporn Tongsalee
Southeast Asian Games medalists in tennis
Competitors at the 1999 Southeast Asian Games
Napaporn Tongsalee